This article discusses political parties in Russia.

The Russian Federation has a de jure multi-party system, however it operates as a near de facto one-party system.  six parties have members in the federal parliament, the State Duma, with one dominant party (United Russia). As of January 19, 2023, 30 political parties are officially registered in the Russian Federation, 28 of which have the right to participate in elections.

History

After the Perestroika reforms in the 1980s Russia had over 100 registered parties, but the people elected to the State Duma represented only a small number of parties. After 2000, during Vladimir Putin's first presidency (2000–2008), the number of parties quickly decreased. From 2008 to 2012 there were only seven parties in Russia, and every new attempt to register new, independent parties was blocked. The last-registered party of this period was the government-organized Right Cause (now the Party of Growth) which was registered on 18 February 2009. Before the 2011 parliamentary election, about 10 opposition parties were denied registration.

In December 2004, amendments were introduced providing for a minimum number of party members of 50 thousand and the presence of more than 45 regional branches (500 people each). By January 1, 2006, all parties had to submit documents proving that their party structures comply with the requirements of the law on the minimum number of members and the number of regional branches.

In 2009, a bill was introduced to reduce, from January 1, 2010, the number of parties required for state registration from 50,000 to 45,000 (in the regional branches of parties - from 500 to 450 members). By January 1, 2012, the mandatory minimum number of party members will be set at 40 thousand, and in the regional branches of the party - up to 400.

On February 28, 2012, an election law was adopted, parties were exempted from collecting signatures and making a cash deposit for nominating a party and its candidate, and gubernatorial elections were restored. The number of required signatures for candidates for the presidential elections in Russia has been reduced, instead of 2 million now it is enough: 100,000 from parties, and 300,000 for self-nominated candidates. The electoral threshold for parties has been reduced from 7% to 5%.

On March 20, 2012, the State Duma approved a presidential bill to reduce the minimum number of political parties, which allows for their creation in Russia instead of 40,000 only 500 people, and for registering a regional branch - instead of 500 - only 5 people.

However, after a series of mass protests and a 2011 European Court decision on the case of the Republican Party of Russia (now the People's Freedom Party), the law changed and the number of registered parties quickly increased to more than 48 .

Party of power

A "party of power" refers to a political party that has a close relationship with the executive branch of government such that the party appears to function as an extension of the executive rather than as an autonomous political organization. The concept resembles that of a cartel party. These parties were specially established for support of the incumbent president or prime minister in the Russian parliament:
Inter-regional Deputies Group/Democratic Russia (1990–1993, Congress of People's Deputies of the Soviet Union/Congress of People's Deputies of Russia/Supreme Soviet of Russia)
Democratic Choice of Russia (1993–1994)
Our Home – Russia (1995–1999)
Unity (1999–2001/2003)
A Just Russia - For Truth  (the second "party of power", supporting Vladimir Putin and opposing United Russia)
United Russia (2001–present)

Legal framework
In 2001, the federal law "On political parties" was adopted. All parties had to be re-registered. Parties have been assigned the status of the only type of public association that has the right to independently nominate candidates for deputies and other elective positions in government bodies. One of the important provisions of the law is the establishment of a single national status of a political party, and, as a result, the liquidation of regional and interregional political public associations. According to paragraph 1 of Article 3 of the Federal Law of the Russian Federation No. 95-FZ “On Political Parties”, a political party in Russia is recognized as "a public association created for the purpose of participation of citizens of the Russian Federation in the political life of society through the formation and expression of their political will, participation in public and political actions, in elections and referendums, as well as in order to represent the interests of citizens in state authorities and local governments".

Social composition of voters
According to studies, United Russia voters in 2007 were younger and more market-oriented than the average voter. The party's electorate includes a substantial share of government employees, pensioners and military personnel, who are dependent on the state for their livelihood. Sixty-four percent of United Russia supporters are female. According to researchers, this could be because women place a great value on stability. In the run-up to the 2011 Duma elections, it was reported that support for United Russia was growing among young people.

Current parties
All parties registered by the Ministry of Justice have the right to participate in any elections all over the country. The list is placed on the Justice Ministry website. In December 2012, there were 48 registered parties in Russia; 6 of them are currently represented in the State Duma as of 2021.

Parties represented in the State Duma and the Federation Council

Parties represented in the regional parliaments

Parties in Russian-occupied regions in Ukraine

List of registered parties

Historical parties (1992–present)

Far-left

Left-wing

Centre-left

Centrist

Centre-right

Right-wing

Far-right

Syncretic

Regionalist parties

Soviet parties, 1917–1992

CPSU and factions

Clandestine and illegal parties

Parties of the multi-party period

Parties of the Russian Empire, 1721–1917

Pre-revolutionary organizations

After-revolutionary parties

Left-wing

Centrist and moderate right

Right-wing

See also
 List of ruling political parties by country
 Politics of Russia

References

Further reading

External links 
 Justice Ministry webpage about Russian political parties
 Central Election Commission of the Russian Federation webpage about Russian political parties

 
Russia
Politics of Russia
Political parties
Political parties
Russia
Russia